Morgan Matthews may refer to:
Morgan Matthews (figure skater), American ice dancer
Morgan Matthews (filmmaker), English filmmaker
Morgan Matthews, a character from the TV series Boy Meets World